Catholic Central High School  is a high school in Windsor, Ontario, Canada. It is operated by the Windsor-Essex Catholic District School Board. Amy Lofaso is the school's principal. Catholic Central High School has a diverse, multicultural student body.

History
Catholic Central was founded in 1985 / 1986 when the Windsor Catholic School Board voted to open a fourth Catholic high school in the city. In January 1986, a principal was chosen: Mr. Ed Johnston (principal 1986 - 1988), who began to visit the feeder schools and work with students who would soon be the school's first class, and would eventually become the first graduates of the school.

The physical location of the school was the first major problem. It was decided that the first year classes would be held in the vacated St. Hubert's School in South Windsor (now occupied by Monseigneur Jean Noel). The first classes began in September 1986 with a staff of 16 teachers. Students were bused out to South Windsor for their classes.

In August 1987, negotiations with the Windsor Public School Board were completed and the school location moved from St. Hubert's. The new location had a long history in the area as a grade school (Guppy), a commercial high school (Commerce) and as the Adult Education Center. In the second year, the staff grew to 36 and there were 470 students in grades 9 and 10. In the fifth year, there were 1074 students and 75 teachers.

Expansion

In 1992, the school began a $4.6 million addition and renovations. The grand opening was held on Nov. 19, 1993 under the leadership of Mr. R. Stephens (Principal 1989 - 1994)

Boys Basketball

Catholic Central has developed a strong history of championship boys basketball teams named the Catholic Central Comets (or CCH Comets). The boys basketball teams have won three Ontario Federation of School Athletic Associations (OFSAA) championships (2006, 2013, 2015), two OFSAA silver medals (2007, 2014) and two OFSAA bronze medals (1997, 1998), as well as 35 WECSSAA and SWOSSAA championships.
Individually, 27 times Catholic Central players have been selected to the 1st team All City and 6 times as WECSSAA MVPs.  At the Junior and Freshman levels, 12 times Catholic Central players were selected as WECSSAA MVPs.

Notable alumni
James Bondy - Professional actor and star of the PBS show Ribert & Roberts Wonderland of Boston, Mass.
Tyrone Crawford -  Arcanum Award recipient.  Defensive End for Boise State. Junior College All American (2009). Named Breakout Player for 2011 by ESPN. Drafted in the 3rd round, 81st overall in the 2012 NFL Draft to the Dallas Cowboys (2012). Led Catholic Central to OFSAA gold medal in basketball in 2006 and silver in 2007. Named league MVP in basketball in 2007. OFSAA champion in Shot Put in 2004 and 2008.
Brendan Dunlop - sportscaster and host of Fox Soccer News / Soccer Central for Sportsnet
Samir El-Mais - 2014 Canadian Heavy Weight Boxing Champion and Commonwealth Games Gold Medalist also Heavy Weight Boxing Bronze Medalist at 2015 Pan Am Games
Miah-Marie Langlois - Olympian, professional basketball player and women's national team member. Led University of Windsor to 4 consecutive national championship. 
Matt Martin - Plays in the NHL for the Toronto Maple Leafs and previously the New York Islanders
Daryl Townsend - Professional football player with CFL, Montreal Alouettes 
Mychal Mulder - Professional basketball player for the Orlando Magic

See also
List of high schools in Ontario

References

External links

 Catholic Central High School Alumni 
 Catholic Central High School Comets Basketball Official website

Windsor-Essex Catholic District School Board
Catholic secondary schools in Ontario
High schools in Windsor, Ontario
Educational institutions established in 1985
1985 establishments in Ontario